Jenny Villiers: A Story of the Theatre is a short novel by J. B. Priestley, first published in 1947.

A successful but dispirited playwright is supervising the rehearsals of his new play, The Glass Door, at an old theatre in North England. The actors are irritated by his cynical attitude, but when left alone in the darkened green room he experiences visions of a 19th-century tragedy which alter his outlook on his profession.

In 1978 it was reprinted by Stein and Day, in a collection of works by Priestley entitled My Three Favorite Novels. The others were Angel Pavement and Bright Day.

Main characters

1946
Martin Cheveril, a 50-year-old playwright
Pauline Fraser, a 45-year-old actress
Mr Otley, the manager
Ann Seward, an aspiring 23-year-old actress

1846
Jenny Villiers, a 24-year-old actress
Julian Napier, a young actor
Walter Kettle, a stagehand

References

1947 British novels
Novels by J. B. Priestley
Novels about writers
Heinemann (publisher) books